Be Big! is a Hal Roach three-reel comedy starring Laurel and Hardy. It was shot in November and December 1930, and released on February 7, 1931.

Opening intertitles
"Mr. Hardy is a man of great care, caution and discretion –
Mr Laurel is married, too –"

Plot
Laurel and Hardy are almost on their way to Atlantic City with their wives, when Ollie gets a phone call from Cookie, a lodge buddy. Cookie tells Ollie that a stag party is taking place that night in their honor and reveals irresistible details of the event when Ollie says they won't be able to attend.

Ollie pretends to be sick and sends the wives on ahead, promising that he and Stan will meet them in the morning. The pair dress in their lodge gear and there are scenes of a lengthy struggle to pull one of Stan's boots off Ollie's foot. The wives then return having missed their train and with no obvious escape route Stan and Ollie take to a Murphy bed in fear and in response to Stan's plea of "What'll I do?", Ollie replies "Be big!".

Cast

Foreign versions 
Be Big! was filmed in two extended foreign-language versions immediately upon completion of its English incarnation. These foreign versions combined the story of the English original with that of Laughing Gravy, another short from the same year.

Les Carottiers was the French version; it replaced Isabelle Keith with Germaine de Neel as Mrs. Hardy and Jean De Briac in Baldwin Cooke's role of "Cookie." The Spanish version, Los Calavaras, featured Linda Loredo as Mrs. Hardy.

Laurel and Hardy delivered their French and Spanish lines phonetically from cue cards in both foreign versions. Anita Garvin played Mrs. Laurel in all three films; she mouthed her foreign lines phonetically, on-camera but off-mic, while a voice actress just off-camera spoke into a "hot" mic.

Production 
The opening titles on the film credit James Parrott as director and Art Lloyd as director of photography, but all contemporary publicity and promotional materials name James W. Horne as director and Jack Stevens as photographer.

Besides serving as a dress extra Jean De Briac was also Laurel's and Hardy's dialogue coach on the French-language version, Les Carottiers (in which he also played Cookie).

This was Anita Garvin's last appearance in a Laurel and Hardy short; since 1927's Why Girls Love Sailors, she had appeared in over a dozen L&H short subjects. She would return in 1938 for their feature Swiss Miss and again in 1940 in A Chump at Oxford.

Reception 
With most of the running time taken up about trying unsuccessfully to change out of each other's riding boots, Be Big! is sometimes regarded as one of the team's weakest short films, with Randy Skretvedt saying; "The film's chief flaw is an excruciatingly protracted sequence which has Stan trying to pull his boot from Hardy's foot; it runs 13 minutes and seems like 20. Fun is fun but there are limits.", while Glenn Mitchell stated that the film was "...generally regarded as an overlong exploration of a single gag. Some idea of its pace may be gauged from the fact that a British 8mm distributor was able to condense the action into an effective single reel!"

References

External links 
  – describing the Spanish version, which, up to the return of the wives, has a plot largely identical to the shorter English version; the description also covers the added Laughing Gravy.
 
 
 
 

1931 films
1931 comedy films
American black-and-white films
Films directed by James Parrott
Laurel and Hardy (film series)
Films with screenplays by H. M. Walker
American multilingual films
1931 multilingual films
1930s English-language films
1930s American films